Nolan Sipe is an American songwriter and record producer. He is the son of the Cleveland Browns football player, Brian Sipe.

Songwriting discography

References

Year of birth missing (living people)
Living people
American record producers
American male songwriters
21st-century American composers
21st-century American male musicians